Castnia estherae is a moth in the Castniidae family. It is found in Mexico.

The length of the forewings is about 47 mm.

Etymology
The species is named for Sra. Esther Arias de Escalante who collected the holotype.

References

Moths described in 1976
Castniidae